The Fashion Stakes was an American Thoroughbred horse race for two-year-old fillies. Raced on dirt over a distance of five furlongs, it was run annually from 1889 through 2005. Inaugurated at Morris Park Racecourse in Westchester County, New York, when that facility closed in 1904 the race was run at Belmont Park and at Aqueduct Racetrack.

The Fashion Stakes was often used as either the first or second start in a young filly's racing career. The event attracted some of the best bred fillies on the East Coast of the United States with several future Champions winning the race including Hall of Fame inductees Affectionately and Ruffian.

The Fashion Stakes was placed on hiatus after the 1984 edition and was not run again until being revived on June 3, 1999.

Records
Speed records
On May 7, 1946, in her first start at Belmont Park First Flight equaled the track record time of 51 seconds for 4½ furlongs which had been set in the Fashion Stakes in 1928 by Orissa.

On May 19, 1971, Ogden Phipps' Numbered Account set a Fashion Stakes record of 0:57 2/5 for five furlongs on dirt at Aqueduct Racetrack.

On June 12, 1974, Mr. and Mrs. Stuart Janney's Ruffian set a Fashion Stakes record that also equaled the Belmont Park track record of 1:03 flat for the then race distance of five and a half furlongs on dirt.|

Most wins by a jockey:
 4 – Braulio Baeza (1962, 1964, 1971, 1972)

Most wins by a trainer:
 6 – James G. Rowe Sr. (1890, 1897, 1906, 1917, 1920, 1926)

Most wins by an owner:
 6 – Harry Payne Whitney (1917, 1920, 1922, 1924, 1926, 1930)

Winners

References

External links
 Video of Ruffian winning the June 12, 1974 Fashion Stakes in record time

Discontinued horse races in New York (state)
Flat horse races for two-year-old fillies
Aqueduct Racetrack
Belmont Park
Recurring sporting events established in 1889
Recurring sporting events disestablished in 2005
1889 establishments in New York (state)
2005 disestablishments in New York (state)